Siebnen is a village in district of March in the canton of Schwyz in Switzerland.

Political affiliation 

The village is politically Siebnen to the three communities Galgenen, Schübelbach and Wangen. The boundaries run right through the center. Siebnen thus consists of the districts Siebnen-Galgenen, Siebnen-Schübelbach and Siebnen-Wangen. Siebnen-Galgenen is separated from the rest of the Wägitaler Aa Siebnen place.

External links
 

Villages in the canton of Schwyz